Wightman may refer to:

Andy Wightman, Scottish Green MSP and writer
Arthur Wightman (1922–2013), American theoretical physicist
Brian Wightman (born 1976), Australian politician
Bruce Wightman (1925–2009), actor who co-founded the Dracula Society in London in 1973
Edith Wightman (1938–1983), British historian and archaeologist
Edward Wightman (1580–1612), English Baptist, last person to be burnt for heresy in England.
Hazel Hotchkiss Wightman (1886–1974), American tennis player
Jake Wightman (born 1994), British athlete
John Wightman (1930–2017), American lawyer and politician
Joseph Wightman (general) (c.1665-1722), a British soldier of the eighteenth century
Julia Parker Wightman (1909-1994), American bibliophile and book collector
Louise Wightman (Lucy) (born 1959), American bodybuilder and dancer
Mark Wightman (born 1947), British chemist
Reginald Wightman (1899–1981), Canadian politician
Robert Wightman (born 1952), American actor
Thomas Wightman (1811–1888), American painter
Bishop William May Wightman (1808–1882), American educator and clergyman

Places
Wightman, Iowa, United States
Wightman, Virginia, United States
Wightmans Grove, Ohio, United States

Other uses
Wightman axioms in quantum field theory, named after Arthur Wightman
Wightman Cup, a former tennis competition between UK and U.S.A. named after Hazel Hotchkiss Wightman

See also
Gairdner Foundation Wightman Award
Whiteman (disambiguation)
Weightman
Wigman

English-language surnames